Big Square Eye is an Australian children's game show aired on ABC TV from 1991 until 1992 and was repeated one last time in 1993. It was hosted by Bob La Castra, with musician Paul Mac as "Knuckles" McDermott on keyboard and sound effects. The programme aired on weekdays just after 5 pm as part of the Afternoon Show programming block.

The premise of the program was that each episode had celebrity guest judges which particular skills which they would demonstrate to the children in the audience. Contestants were selected from the audience to attempt a challenge which involved the celebrity guest's skills to their satisfaction. Guest judges included artist Ken Done, entertainer Jeanne Little, and cricketer Mark Waugh.

References

Australian Broadcasting Corporation original programming
Australian children's television series
Australian children's game shows
1991 Australian television series debuts
1993 Australian television series endings
1990s Australian game shows